Ivo Johannes Ignatius Niehe (born 31 May 1946) is a Dutch radio and television presenter, television producer and actor.

Biography 
Niehe was born in Amsterdam in 1946. He studied French at the University of Amsterdam and received a graduate degree in French Language and Literature in 1973.

In 1967 he recorded and released a single called Mountain of Love with his group Ivo and the Furies, he later released two other singles Mit dir in meinen Armen and Wer sucht der wird find.

In 1975 he started working for TROS as a television announcer and in 1978 he became Head of Entertainment at TROS. Niehe retired from Head of Entertainment in 1982 and started his own television production company  Ivo Niehe Productions that was based on Gardening, cooking and entertainment programmes. His production company was also responsible for producing the entertainment talkshow featuring celebrities and notable Dutch people from all walks of life, TROS TV Show.

In 1984 he provided the Dutch commentary for the 1984 Eurovision Song Contest.

In 2001 Niehe was awarded the Officer of the Order of Orange-Nassau for his charity work.

In 2005 Niehe moved from TROS to Talpa, but he has since returned to TROS, and later AVROTROS. Since 2009 he opened a new company for theatre and television called Niehe Media.

Trivia
Ivo is a devoted Ajax Amsterdam supporter. His elder brother Eric is a former Olympic rower.

References

External links

 Niehe Media
 Ivo Niehe productions

1946 births
Living people
Dutch television presenters
Dutch television producers
Dutch television talk show hosts
Mass media people from Amsterdam
University of Amsterdam alumni
Nationaal Songfestival presenters